Marc Alyn (Alain-Marc Fécherolle), (born 18 March 1937 in Reims) is a French poet.

Life
He was mobilized to Algeria in 1957.

He lived far from Paris, a farmhouse in Uzès, Gard.
He traveled in the Middle East to the ruins of the Phoenician city of Byblos, and to Beirut, where he met the French Lebanese poet Nohad Salameh, whom he married.

He got cancer of the larynx, which deprived him for many years of the use of his voice. He is a member of the Académie Mallarmé and Prix Guillaume Apollinaire jury.

Awards
 1994: Grand Prix du roman de l'Académie française 
 2005: Prix Henri de Régnier
 2007: Prix Goncourt

Works

English Translations
 French poetry today: a bilingual anthology, Simon Watson Taylor, Edward Lucie-Smith, editors, Rapp and Whiting; Deutsch, 1971
The Big supposer: Lawrence Durrell a dialogue with Marc Alyn Translator Francine Barker, Grove Press, 1973

Poetry
"LA BIBLIOTHEQUE DANS LE MIROIR", Le Printemps des Poetes
 Liberté de voir  Terre de Feu (1956).
 Le Temps des autres, Seghers (1956) Prix Max Jacob 1957.
 Cruels divertissements, Seghers (1957).
 Jean-Louis Trintignant dit les poèmes de Marc Alyn, Véga-Seghers, (1958).
 Serge Reggiani dit, Marc Ogeret chante Marc Alyn, Studio S.M. (1958).
 Brûler le feu, Seghers (1959).
 Délébiles , Ides et Calendes (1962).
 Nuit majeure, Flammarion (1968).
 Infini au-delà, Flammarion (1972) Prix Apollinaire 1973.
 Douze poèmes de l'été, Formes et langages (1976).
 Rêves secrets des tarots, Formes et langages (1984).
 Poèmes pour notre amour, Formes et langages (1985).
 Le Livre des amants, Des Créateurs (1988).
 Les Alphabets du Feu: Byblos, La Parole planète, Le Scribe errant, ID- Livre (1991–1993) Grand Prix de Poésie de l'Académie française 1994 et Grand Prix de Poésie de la SGDL 1994.
 Le Chemin de la parole, (1994).
 L'Etat naissant, (1996).
 Les Mots de passe, (1997).
 L'Oeil imaginaire, (1998).
 Le Miel de l'abîme, (2000).
 Les Miroirs byzantins, Alain Benoit (2001).
 Le Tireur isolé, Phi/Ecrits des Forges (2010).
  La Combustion de l'ange 1956-2011, preface by Bernard Noël, 2011.

Prose 

 Marcel Béalu, Subervie (1956).
 François Mauriac, Seghers (1960).
 Célébration du tabac, Robert Morel, (1962).
 Les Poètes du XVIe siècle, J'ai Lu (1962).
 Dictionnaire des auteurs français, Seghers (1962).
 Dylan Thomas, Seghers (1962).
 Le Déplacement, Flammarion (1964).
 Gérard de Nerval, J'ai Lu (1965).
 Srecko Kosovel, Seghers (1965).
 André de Richaud, Seghers (1966).
 Odette Ducarre ou Les Murs de la Nuit, Robert Morel (1967).
 La Nouvelle Poésie française, Robert Morel (1968).
 Norge, Seghers (1972).
 Entretiens avec Lawrence Durrell, Pierre Belfond (1972) et Gutenberg (2007).
 Le Diderot de Borès, Galerie du Salin (1975).
 Kama Kamanda: poète universel: hommage, L'Harmattan, 1997, 
 Le Manuscrit de Roquemaure, Le Chariot, (2002).
 Mémoires provisoires, L'Harmattan, (2002).
 Le Silentiaire, Dumerchez, (2004).
 Le Piéton de Venise, Bartillat, (2005).
 Les Miroirs voyants, Voix d'encre (2005).
 Le Dieu de sable, Phi/ Ecrit des Forges, (2006).
 Paris point du jour, Bartillat, (2006).
 Approches de l'art moderne,  Bartillat (2007).
 Monsieur le chat, Ecriture (2009) Prix Littéraire 30 Millions d'Amis, 2009
 Anthologie poétique amoureuse, Ecriture (2010).

External links
"Marc Alyn", Robert Holkeboer, Books Abroad, Vol. 46, No. 3 (Summer, 1972), pp. 422-425 

1937 births
Living people
Writers from Reims
20th-century French poets
French military personnel of the Algerian War
Prix Goncourt de la Poésie winners
Prix Guillaume Apollinaire winners
21st-century French poets
21st-century French male writers
French male poets
20th-century French male writers